Enayet Karim is a Bangladeshi film director. He is most remembered for his film like Ruti (1998) which he produced. It was directed by Nadeem Mahmud and produced by Enayet Karim. He directed films like Desher Mati (1998), Kalo Choshma (1998), Khudhar Jaala etc.

Films

References 

Bangladeshi screenwriters
Bangladeshi film directors
Bangladeshi film producers